Renuzit is an American brand of air fresheners produced by Henkel North American Consumer Goods. The Renuzit brand once included a solvent-based spot remover and cleaner as well.

History
Renuzit cleaning fluid was originally produced by the Radbill Oil Co. of Philadelphia in 1932, which became Renuzit Home Products Company before 1947. The company was acquired by Drackett in 1969, which had been bought by Bristol-Myers in 1965, which in turn, merged with Squibb in 1989.

In 1992, Bristol-Myers Squibb sold Drackett to S. C. Johnson & Son, at which point, the Federal Trade Commission ordered S.C. Johnson to divest itself of Renuzit and certain other products within a year, and not purchase any other company making air fresheners for 10 years. The following year, S.C. Johnson sold Renuzit to The Dial Corporation. In 2004, Dial became a subsidiary of Henkel. (based in Düsseldorf, Germany)

References

 "Clearing the Air About a Label" by Henry Gilgoff in the June 9, 1995 Newsday.

External links 
 Official site
 FTC order

Henkel brands
Dial Corporation brands
Cleaning product brands